The women's finweight (46 kilograms) event at the 2014 Asian Games took place on 1 October 2014 at Ganghwa Dolmens Gymnasium, Incheon, South Korea.

A total of twelve competitors from twelve countries competed in this event, limited to fighters whose body weight was less than 46 kilograms.

Kim So-hui of South Korea won the gold medal.

Schedule
All times are Korea Standard Time (UTC+09:00)

Results 
Legend
R — Won by referee stop contest
W — Won by withdrawal

References

External links
Official website

Taekwondo at the 2014 Asian Games